Tinaroo apicicollis is a beetle in the Staphylinidae family, which is found in New South Wales.

It was first described by Arthur Mills Lea in 1911 as Batrisodes apicicollis from a male specimen collected in the Illawarra.

Description
Lea describes the species:

References 

Beetles described in 1911
Taxa named by Arthur Mills Lea
Pselaphinae